Frederick or Fred or Freddy or Freddie Brown may refer to:

Artists and musicians
 Freddie Brown (musician) (1940–2002), American New Mexico musician
 Frederick Brown (artist) (1851–1941), British artist and founder member of the New English Art Club
 Frederick J. Brown (1945–2012), American painter of musicians

Politicians
 Fred Brown (Alaska politician) (1943–2014), American lawyer and politician, member of the Alaska House of Representatives 1975–1983
 Fred Brown (Texas politician), Republican member of the Texas House of Representatives
 Fred H. Brown (1879–1955), former United States Congressman from New Hampshire

Sports

American football
 Fred Brown (American football guard) (1905–1979)
 Fred Brown (linebacker) (born 1943)
 Fred Brown (wide receiver) (born 1993), American football player

Association football
 Fred Brown (footballer, born 1895) (1895–1960), English football inside forward
 Fred Brown (footballer, born 1931) (1931–2013), English football goalkeeper
 Freddie Brown (footballer) (1878–1939), English footballer forward

Rugby
 Fred Brown (rugby league, Wales), Welsh rugby league footballer of the 1920s
 Fred Brown (rugby league, Sydney), Australian rugby player of the 1940s
 Fred Brown (rugby league, born 1926) (1926–2016), Australian rugby league player

Other sports
 Fred Brown (Australian footballer) (1896–1971), Australian rules footballer
 Fred H. Brown (1879–1955), American baseball player and politician
 Fred Brown (basketball) (born 1948), American former basketball player
 Fred Brown (ice hockey) (1900–1970), Canadian ice hockey player
 Freddie Brown (cricketer) (1910–1991), Peruvian-born English cricketer and cricket commentator

Other
 Fred Brown (virologist) (1925–2004), British virologist and molecular biologist
 Frederick Brown (editor) (born 1934), professor, author, editor and translator of French literature, see Bollingen Foundation
 Frederick Brown (sound editor) (1935–2003), American sound editor
 Frederick Elliott Brown (1895–1971), Canadian World War I flying ace credited with 10 aerial victories
 Fredric Brown (1906–1972), American science fiction and mystery author